Myriophora is a genus of flies in the family Phoridae.

Species
M. aequaliseta (Borgmeier, 1963)
M. alexandrae Hash & Brown, 2015
M. alienipennis Hash & Brown, 2015
M. angustifacies Hash & Brown, 2015
M. annetteae Hash & Brown, 2015
M. annulata Hash & Brown, 2015
M. bicuspidis Hash & Brown, 2015
M. bilsae Hash & Brown, 2015
M. bimaculata Hash & Brown, 2015
M. borealis Hash & Brown, 2015
M. breviatrsus Hash & Brown, 2015
M. browni Hash, 2015
M. brunneipleuron Hash & Brown, 2015
M. communis Hash & Brown, 2015
M. curvata Hash & Brown, 2015
M. curvicacumen Hash & Brown, 2015
M. dennisoni Hash & Brown, 2015
M. discalis Hash & Brown, 2015
M. diversa Hash & Brown, 2015
M. dividida Hash & Brown, 2015
M. dolionatis Hash & Brown, 2015
M. flavicosta Hash & Brown, 2015
M. fuscidorsum Hash & Brown, 2015
M. gigantea Hash & Brown, 2015
M. gobaleti Hash & Brown, 2015
M. harwoodi Hash & Brown, 2015
M. hebes Hash & Brown, 2015
M. heratyi Hash & Brown, 2015
M. inaequalisetarum Hash & Brown, 2015
M. infirmata Hash & Brown, 2015
M. jeffersoni Hash & Brown, 2015
M. juli (Brues, 1908)
M. kerri Hash & Brown, 2015
M. kungae Hash & Brown, 2015
M. longisetarum Hash & Brown, 2015
M. lucigaster (Borgmeier, 1961)
M. luteitergum Hash & Brown, 2015
M. luteizona (Borgmeier, 1925)
M. magnilabellum Hash & Brown, 2015
M. misionesensis Hash & Brown, 2015
M. nigra Hash & Brown, 2015
M. nigralinea Hash & Brown, 2015
M. obscuritergum Hash & Brown, 2015
M. opilionidis (Borgmeier, 1931)
M. pabloi (Brown, 1994)
M. pallida Hash & Brown, 2015
M. parva Hash & Brown, 2015
M. pectinata Hash & Brown, 2015
M. perpendicularis Hash & Brown, 2015
M. plana Hash & Brown, 2015
M. porrasae Hash & Brown, 2015
M. porrecta Hash & Brown, 2015
M. reminatis Hash & Brown, 2015
M. scopulata Hash & Brown, 2015
M. simplex Hash & Brown, 2015
M. sinesplendida Hash & Brown, 2015
M. smithi Hash & Brown, 2015
M. spicaphora Hash & Brown, 2015
M. spicaticonus Hash & Brown, 2015
M. tenuis Hash & Brown, 2015
M. uruguaiensis Hash & Brown, 2015
M. vancouverensis Hash & Brown, 2015
M. wellsorum Hash & Brown, 2015

References

Phoridae
Platypezoidea genera